Xuan paper (xuanzhi ), or Shuen paper or rice paper, is a kind of paper originating in ancient China used for writing and painting. Xuan paper is renowned for being soft and fine textured, suitable for conveying the artistic expression of both Chinese calligraphy and painting.

Origin 
Xuan paper was first mentioned in ancient Chinese books Notes of Past Famous Paintings and New Book of Tang. It was originally produced in the Tang dynasty in Jing County, which was under the jurisdiction of Xuan Prefecture (Xuanzhou), hence the name Xuan paper. During the Tang dynasty, the paper was often a mixture of hemp (the first fiber used for paper in China) and mulberry fiber. By the Song dynasty, the paper producing industries in Huizhou and Chizhou were gradually transferred to Jing County.

Classification 
Due to different producing methods, Xuan paper can be classified into Shengxuan, Shuxuan, and Banshuxuan. Shengxuan (literally "Raw Xuan"), which is not specially processed, excels in its ability to absorb water, causing the ink on it to blur. Shuxuan (literally "Ripe Xuan"), however, has potassium alum worked into it during production, which results in a stiffer texture, a reduced ability to absorb water, and less resistance to shear stress (meaning that it can be torn much more easily). This feature makes Shuxuan more suitable for Gongbi rather than Xieyi. Banshuxuan (literally "Half-ripe Xuan") has intermediate absorbability, between Shengxuan and Shuxuan.

Features 
Xuan paper features great tensile strength, smooth surface, pure and clean texture and clean stroke, great resistance to crease, corrosion, moth and mold. The majority of ancient Chinese books and paintings by famous painters that survived until today are well preserved on Xuan paper. Xuan paper won the Golden Award at the Panama International Exposition in 1915. Xuan paper was used to make scrolls.

Material and production 
The material Xuan paper uses is closely related to the geography of Jing County. The bark of Pteroceltis tatarinowii, a common species of elm in the area, was used as the main material to produce Xuan paper. Rice, along with several other materials, was subsequently added to the recipe in the Song and Yuan Dynasties. Bamboo and mulberry also began to be used to produce xuan paper around that time.

The production of Xuan paper can be loosely described as an 18-step process, and a detailed account would involve over a hundred. Some paper makers have invented steps which have been kept secret from others. The process includes steaming and bleaching the bark of Pteroceltis tatarinowii as well as the addition of a variety of juices.

See also 
 Rice paper

References 

 Anhui Xuan paper on chinaculture.org, retrieved on 2009-02-08.
  Xuan paper at Anhui Online Library, retrieved on 2009-02-08.

Chinese calligraphy
Chinese inventions
Chinese painting
Hemp
Intangible Cultural Heritage of Humanity
Papermaking in China